Choi Jung-yoon (born 9 May 1977) is a South Korean actress. She is best known for starring in television dramas, with leading roles in Romance Hunter (2007), Manny (2011), Ojakgyo Family (2011), Angel's Choice (2012), and Cheer Up, Mr. Kim! (2012). Choi has also appeared in supporting roles on the big screen, notably in Ahn Byeong-ki's horror movies and Lee Joon-ik's dramedy Radio Star (2006).

Personal life
Choi married Yoon Tae-jun on 3 December 2011. Yoon is the eldest son of Park Sung-gyung, vice chairwoman of retail conglomerate E-Land Group; currently a businessman, Yoon was also a member of the short-lived '90s boy band Eagle Five. They welcomed a daughter in Nov 2016. On 6 October 2021, Choi's agency confirmed that she is in the process of divorcing her husband.

Filmography

Television series

Film

Television show

Theater

Awards and nominations

References

External links 
  
 Choi Jung-yoon at Daum 
 
 
 

Actresses from Seoul
South Korean television actresses
South Korean film actresses
1977 births
Living people
20th-century South Korean actresses
21st-century South Korean actresses